Seo Eun-soo (born March 2, 1994) is a South Korean actress and model. Seo made her acting debut in the 2016 television drama Don’t Dare to Dream. Seo received her big break after portraying the role of Seo Ji-soo in the KBS2 family drama My Golden Life (2017-2018). She appeared in other popular dramas, such as Dr. Romantic (2016), Duel (2017), Top Management (2018), and Legal High (2019).
Her other works include The Smile Has Left Your Eyes (2018), Top Management (2018), Legal High (2019), Missing: The Other Side (2020), and The Witch: Part 2. The Other One (2022).

Early life and education 
Seo was born in March 2, 1994 at Busan, South Korea. Seo wanted to be an actress while she was in elementary school, but her parents disapproved of her aspirations. In 2007 to 2013, Seo studied middle school and high school at Haeundae Tourism High School. From the second grade of middle school until the second grade of high school, she focused on dancing. When she was a sophomore at Haeundae, she dreamed of becoming an actress by making a monologue and she was acting by herself while watching the work. She finally enrolled in the acting program at the Korea National University of Arts in 2013 and graduated there with a degree in acting.
In 2015, she began acting in commercials, which attracted the public's attention. Several dramas starred the actress.

Career

2015: Predebut and Career Beginnings 
Seo had always wanted to be an actress, but it took her a long time to persuade her parents to allow her enroll in acting classes. She enrolled in the Korea National University of Arts in 2013, and it was about that time, while she was looking for part-time work, that she received her first offer to appear in a commercial in 2015.

Seo played the role of a young female telemarketer who smiled brightly and showed a positive image despite the vain requests in her simple and innocent appearance without makeup.

2016–present: Acting Debut and Career 
She started her acting career as she took the lead role in the short film Hongeo: Fermented Skate Fish (2016) and her first television appearance in the series Don't Dare to Dream (2016), which was quickly followed by the popular drama series Dr. Romantic (2016). In the 2016 SBS television program, Don’t Dare to Dream, Seo made her acting debut. She was cast as one of the leads in the OCN sci-fi thriller Duel in 2017. She received her big break in the same year by portraying the sister of Shin Hye-sun's character in the popular KBS2 family drama My Golden Life. For her performance in the show, she took home the Best New Actress prize at the 11th Korea Drama Awards. The drama also won her nominations for Best New Actress at the 54th Baeksang Arts Awards and the 31st KBS Drama Awards.

She portrayed a passionate and upright new lawyer in the JTBC legal drama Legal High in 2019. She joined the OCN fantasy thriller Missing: The Other Side in 2020.

In early 2022, she starred in the political drama Kingmaker (2021) and appeared in the movie The Witch: Part 2. The Other One.

Filmography

Film

Television series

Web series

Television shows

Awards and nominations

References

External links 

 Seo Eun-soo at Instagram
 Seo Eun-soo at HanCinema

21st-century South Korean actresses
South Korean television actresses
South Korean film actresses
South Korean female models
South Korean web series actresses
1994 births
Living people
People from Busan
Korea National University of Arts alumni